Center Valley is a small unincorporated residential and agricultural community in the town of Center, Outagamie County, Wisconsin, United States.

Geography
Center Valley is located at  (44.4022079, -88.4598254), and the elevation is 820 feet (250 m).

Transportation

County Highway A runs north-south through Center Valley.
Center Valley Road runs east-west through Center Valley.
The Canadian National Railroad operates a line as well as a station in Center Valley.

References

External links
Center Valley, Wisconsin

Unincorporated communities in Outagamie County, Wisconsin
Unincorporated communities in Wisconsin